Denis Jäpel (born 26 May 1998) is a German footballer who plays for Regionalliga Nordost side Chemie Leipzig.

References

Living people
1998 births
Association football forwards
German footballers
FC Carl Zeiss Jena players
VfB Germania Halberstadt players
FSV Zwickau players
1. FC Lokomotive Leipzig players
BSG Chemie Leipzig (1997) players
3. Liga players
Regionalliga players
21st-century German people